The 1997 Asian Women's Handball Championship was the sixth Asian Championship, which took place from 4 to 9 June 1997 in Amman, Jordan. It acts as the Asian qualifying tournament for the 1997 World Women's Handball Championship.

Standings

Results

Final standing

References
Results

External links
www.asianhandball.com

Asian
H
Asian Handball Championships
H
June 1997 sports events in Asia